Vakarino is a rural locality (a village) in Yurochenskoye Rural Settlement, Sheksninsky District, Vologda Oblast, Russia. The population was 10 as of 2002.

Geography 
Vakarino is located 38 km south of Sheksna (the district's administrative centre) by road. Grigoryevskoye is the nearest rural locality.

References 

Rural localities in Sheksninsky District